The 1949 Ulster Grand Prix was the fifth round of the 1949 Grand Prix motorcycle racing season. It took place at the Clady Circuit.

British rider Leslie Graham riding an AJS won the 500 cc race from Artie Bell and Nello Pagani. The race victory for Graham, with Pagani only in third place, wrapped up the first world championship for Graham. Similarly AJS secured the constructor's title.

It was also the final race of the 350 cc title. British Velocette rider Freddie Frith was already world champion having achieved a perfect score and in winning the Ulster Grand Prix he completed a remarkable clean sweep, winning all five races of the championship.

500 cc classification

350 cc classification

250 cc classification

References

Ulster Grand Prix
Ulster
Ulster
Ulster Grand Prix
Ulster Grand Prix